Oak National Academy is an organisation providing an online classroom and resource hub in the UK. It provides teachers with free lessons and resources for pupils aged from 4 to 16, from reception to year 11. Oak also includes a specialist curriculum for supporting pupils who normally attend specialist settings.

Oak was created in response to the 2020 United Kingdom education shutdown during the COVID-19 pandemic. It remained available for teachers to use throughout the 2020/21 academic year to support schools with disruption.

Oak became an independent public body in 2022.

Governance
Oak National Academy was founded in April 2020 in response to school closures during the covid-19 pandemic, and was originally incubated as part of the Reach Foundation in Feltham, registered charity 1129683.

Oak’s leadership team consists of:

 Matt Hood, Principal. Matt is the Principal at Oak National Academy. He's an economics teacher by training and was a founder at  Ambition Institute. He is Chair of Governors at Bay Leadership Academy in Morecambe, a Trustee at The Brilliant Club, and an independent government adviser on professional development.
 John Roberts, Technology Director. John is CEO of Edapt which provides edu-legal support to school staff and former teacher.
 Jonathan Dando, External Relations Director. Jonathan is on secondment from role as Communications and Marketing Director at Teach First
 Tom Rose, Programme Director. Tom was formerly Venture Partner at Ark.

Oak’s project board consists of:

 Sir Ian Bauckham CBE, Chair. Ian is a past president of the ASCL, now CEO of Sabre Education charity , and chair of a multi-academy trust
 Leora Cruddas, chief executive of the Confederation of School Trusts. She has worked for the ASCL and been Director of Education in two London Local Authorities, Harrow and Waltham Forest.
 Daisy Christodoulou, who works on online assessment as Director of Education at No More Marking
 Jon Coles, Chief Executive of the nationwide United Learning multi-academy trust. He worked for 15 years in the Department for Education, and is a Council member of King’s College London.
 Ed Vainker, Executive Principal of Reach Academy Feltham. He was in the first cohort to do Teach First in 2003 and supported the set up of similar organisations to Teach First around the world. He was awarded an OBE in the 2020 New Years Honours list.
 John Blake, who focuses on the role and purpose of curriculum design. He is a qualified teacher, with 10 years experience in the classroom and middle and senior leadership roles in multi-academy trusts. He is a published writer on education policy,[where?] and has advised the Department for Education and the No 10 Policy Unit.

History
The Oak National Academy was set up by a North London free school.

It is an online classroom and resource hub created in response to the closure of schools during the coronavirus pandemic. which provided free online lessons and resources to pupils from reception to year 10. It published a specialist curriculum for pupils who normally attend specialist settings.

It was announced on Sunday 19 April, and received the backing of the Department for Education. It delivered two million lessons in its first week of operation.

On Tuesday 23 June, the government announced that Oak National Academy would be given £4.3 million funding to provide lessons for pupils for the 2020/21 academic year as a contingency plan for the continuing pandemic. Teachers will be recording lessons over summer 2020 and will be reimbursed for their time.

Description
The material is accessed from a free website, sortable by year group and subject or schedule.

From April 2020, teachers from English state schools created and uploaded video lessons each week. Every lesson is an hour long and includes a quiz, a video explanation from the teacher, and a worksheet.

From April 2020, the TES and Oak National Academy ran weekly assemblies. Speakers have included The Duchess of Cambridge and The Archbishop of Canterbury.

During the school holidays, Oak ran online activity clubs for pupils to take part in. These were provided by organisations like the Scouts, Bite Back 2030 and Jamie’s Farm and include activities like cook-a-long, arts and debating clubs.

Impact
Oak commissioned research in late spring 2020 to understand who was using the platform and what improvements they wanted. To meet schools’ needs, Oak released its curriculum plan for 2020/21 in July and prepared the majority of lessons for September.

In total, over 4.7m people had visited Oak in its first term, with an average of 220,000 users each day. People who had visited the Oak website had taken part in just under 20 million lessons which included 15 million hours of video material.

The research also looked at why teachers are using Oak. Reduced workload and improving the quality of teaching and learning were reported by teachers as being the two biggest motivations for using Oak. A third of teachers said that their main motivation for using Oak was to help them manage their workload; 27% referenced the main benefit as improving the quality of teaching and learning they could offer.

Potential barriers to teachers using Oak were also identified. In response, Oak has set up a series of advisory groups to make sure it works for as many schools as possible. Oak also released its curriculum plan for 2020/21 in July to help schools plan.

A quarter of the teachers surveyed also explained that their pupils do not have internet at home. Oak stated, where copyright allows, it will make resources downloadable with content that can be edited locally for 2020/21.

References

External links 

British educational websites
2020 establishments in the United Kingdom
Internet properties established in 2020
Educational institutions established in 2020